Lee Hoesung is a Zainichi Korean novelist in Japan. He writes under the pen name Ri Kaisei, the Japanese reading of his Korean name. In 1972, he became the first ethnic Korean to win the Akutagawa Prize for his story "The Woman Who Fulled Clothes" (Kinuta wo utsu onna). Other representative works of his include Mihatenu Yume (見果てぬ夢; Unfulfilled Dream) and Hyakunen no tabibitotachi (百年の旅人たち; Travellers of a Hundred Years).

Biography
Lee was born in 1935 to Korean immigrant parents in Maoka, Karafuto Prefecture (the southern half of modern-day Sakhalin), and lived there until age 10.  After the surrender of Japan which ended World War II, Lee's family, having mixed in with Japanese settlers, escaped from the Soviet troops and fled Karafuto. They went as far as a processing center in Nagasaki for migrants repatriating from former territories of the Empire of Japan, but finding themselves unable to return to Korea as they had planned, they settled down in Sapporo, Hokkaidō. At that time, Lee's older sister had been left behind in Karafuto; in his later works, he describes the traumatic impression this left on him. From Sapporo's West High School, Lee advanced to Tokyo's Waseda University, where he studied literature. While there, he was active in exchange student activities.  After graduation, he first aimed at creative work in Korean, but then decided to become active in Japanese instead. He was also employed at the Choson Sinbo, a Korean newspaper run by pro-North Korea ethnic activist group Chongryon, but afterwards separated himself from them, and 1969, having been awarded the Gunzo Prize for New Writers for Kinuta wo utsu onna, threw himself into the literary world. Kinuta wo utsu onna was notable at the time for its sporadic use of Korean words.

In 1970, he secretly visited South Korea, and went again after winning the Akutagawa Prize in 1972. At that time, he held Chōsen-seki rather than South Korean nationality. Afterwards, due to the problem of his nationality, he was refused a visa several times by the South Korean government, and it would be until November 1995 before he was granted permission to enter again. However, in 1998, with the start of Kim Dae-jung's Sunshine Policy, he was able to obtain South Korean citizenship. He was later criticised by fellow zainichi writer Kim Sok-pom (金石範) for his comments about the democratization of South Korea and his naturalization as a South Korean, over which the two had a vigorous debate in magazines.

On the problem of North Korean abductions of Japanese, Lee has stated: "The confession of Kim Jong-il, who apologised for his errors, should be accepted by Japanese people in the spirit of historical consciousness and the peace constitution."

Awards
 1969: 12th Gunzo Prize for New Writers (群像新人文学賞) for Mata futatabi no michi (またふたたびの道)
 1972: 66th Akutagawa Prize for Kinuta wo utsu onna (砧をうつ女)
 1994: Noma Prize for Literature for Hyakunen no tabibitotachi (百年の旅人たち)

Major works
Title translations are not official English titles
 Kinuta wo utsu onna (砧をうつ女)
 Watashi no Saharin (私のサハリン; My Sakhalin)
 Kayako no tameni (伽倻子のために; For Kayako; made into a movie by 小栗康平 in 1984)
 Imujingawa wo mezasu toki (イムジン江をめざすとき; Eyes on the Imjin River)
 Ryūminten (流民伝; Refugee Tales)
 Kanōsei toshite no "Zainichi" (可能性としての「在日」; "Zainichi" as a possibility)
 Chijō seikatsusha (地上生活者; Living on land; serialized in Gunzo Magazine)

References

Japanese-language writers
People from Sakhalin Oblast
People from Sapporo
South Korean expatriates in Japan
South Korean novelists
Zainichi Korean people
Living people
1935 births
Waseda University alumni